Ezequiel is a given name. Notable people with the name include:

People
Ezequiel Adamovsky (born 1971), Argentine historian and political activist
Ezequiel Alejo Carboni (born 1979), is an Argentine midfielder
Ezequiel Andreoli (born 1978), Argentine footballer
Ezequiel Astacio (born 1979), Major League Baseball pitcher
Ezequiel Baptista (born 1926), former Portuguese footballer who played as midfielder
Ezequiel Bitok (born 1966), retired Kenyan runner
Ezequiel Bosio (born 1985), Argentine racing driver
Ezequiel Brítez (born 1985), Argentine footballer
Ezequiel Cabeza De Baca (1864–1917), served briefly as the second Governor of New Mexico before his death in 1917
Ezequiel Cacace (born 1984), Argentine footballer
Ezequiel Calvente (born 1991), Spanish footballer
Ezequiel Carballo (born 1989), Argentine footballer
Ezequiel Carrasco (born 2002), Canadian soccer player
Ezequiel Carrera (born 1987), Major League Baseball center fielder
Ezequiel Castaño (born 1981), well known Argentine actor
Ezequiel Castillo (beach volleyball), male beach volleyball player from Dominican Republic
Ezequiel Castillo (footballer) (born 1967), retired Argentine footballer who played as a midfielder
Ezequiel Cirigliano (born 1992), Argentine football midfielder
Ezequiel Fernández (Panamanian politician) (1886–1946), Second Vice President of Panama from 1936 to 1939
Ezequiel Filipetto (born 1987), Argentine football defender
Ezequiel Garay (born 1986), Argentine footballer
Ezequiel González (born 1980), Argentine football
Ezequiel Guillermo Jesus Amaya (born 1978), Argentinian footballer
Ezequiel Gutiérrez Iglesias (1840–1920), Costa Rican politician
Ezequiel Hurtado, politician, military general and statesman who became President of Colombia
Ezequiel Lázaro (born 1981), Argentine footballer
Ezequiel Lavezzi (born 1985), Argentine football striker
Ezequiel Lazo (born 1989), Argentine footballer
Ezequiel Luna (born 1986), Argentine footballer
Ezequiel Maderna (born 1986), boxer in the Light Heavyweight division
Ezequiel Maggiolo (born 1977), Argentine football striker
Ezequiel Martínez Estrada (1895–1964), Argentine writer, poet, essayist, and literary critic
Ezequiel Medrán (born 1980), Argentine football goalkeeper
Ezequiel Miralles (born 1983), Argentine footballer who plays as a striker
Ezequiel Montalt (born 1977), Spanish actor
Ezequiel Moreno y Díaz, member of the Order of Augustinian Recollects, now venerated as a Saint in the Roman Catholic Church
Ezequiel Mosquera (born 1975), Spanish professional road bicycle racer for UCI ProTeam Vacansoleil-DCM
Ezequiel Muñoz (born 1990), Argentine footballer who plays as a centre back
Ezequiel Orozco (born 1988), Mexican professional football forward
Ezequiel Padilla Peñaloza (1890–1971), Mexican statesman
Ezequiel Paulón (born 1976), field hockey defender from Argentina
Ezequiel Rescaldani (born 1992), Argentine football centre forward
Ezequiel Santiago (1973–2019), American politician
Ezequiel Scarione (born 1985), Argentine football midfielder
Ezequiel Schelotto (born 1989), Argentine-born Italian footballer
Ezequiel Skverer (born 1989), Israeli-Argentinian basketball player
Ezequiel Uricoechea (1834–1880), Colombian linguist and scientist
Ezequiel Viñao (born 1960), Argentine-American composer
Ezequiel Videla (born 1987), Argentinian footballer
Ezequiel Zamora (1817–1860), Venezuelan soldier and leader of the Federalists in the Federal War (Guerra Federal) of 1859–1863
Lisandro Ezequiel López (born 1989), Argentine football defender
Manuel Ezequiel Bruzual (1832–1868), military leader committed to liberal ideas, designated provisional President of Venezuela in 1868
Maximiliano Ezequiel dos Santos or simply Max Santos (born 1987), Brazilian football Forward
Nicolas Ezequiel Gorosito (born 1988), Argentine football defender

Places
Coronel Ezequiel, municipality in the state of Rio Grande do Norte in the Northeast region of Brazil
Ezequiel Montes, Querétaro, municipality in the Mexican state of Querétaro
Ezequiel Montes Municipality, municipality in Querétaro in central Mexico
Ezequiel Zamora Municipality, Barinas, one of the 12 municipalities (municipios) that makes up the Venezuelan state of Barinas
Manuel Ezequiel Bruzual Municipality, one of the 21 municipalities (municipios) that makes up the eastern Venezuelan state of Anzoátegui

Art, entertainment, and media
Ezequiel, the fictitious head of the Process in 3%

Spanish masculine given names

de:Ezechiel (Begriffsklärung)
es:Ezequiel
fr:Ézéchiel (homonymie)
pt:Ezequiel (desambiguação)
sl:Ezekiel (razločitev)